The Moab LDS Church is a historic church in Moab, Utah. It was built with adobe for the Church of Jesus Christ of Latter-day Saints in 1888–1889, on land that belonged to Leonidas L. Crapo. The local bishop, Randolph H. Stewart, had acquired the land in 1884, and he later sold it to his second counselor, Orlando W. Warner. The church was designed in the Greek Revival style, and it was later stuccoed. The building was deeded to the Grand County School District in 1925. By 1937, the Daughters of Utah Pioneers began holding their meetings in the old church. It has been listed on the National Register of Historic Places since November 28, 1980.

References

Adobe buildings and structures
Meetinghouses of the Church of Jesus Christ of Latter-day Saints in Utah
National Register of Historic Places in Grand County, Utah
Greek Revival architecture in Utah
Churches completed in 1889
1889 establishments in Utah Territory